The Square Deal was U.S. President Theodore Roosevelt's domestic program.

Square Deal may also refer to:
Square Deal (game), a tile-based board game
Square Deal: The Game of Two Dimensional Poker or Cadillac II, a Game Boy video game
Square Deal Social & Pleasure Club, a jazz ensemble including Lionel Batiste
A Square Deal, a radio show featuring Hubert Gregg
Square Deal, an artwork by Lorna Simpson
Square Deal (TV series), a 1988–1989 British sitcom
A Square Deal, a 1917 American silent film directed by Harley Knoles
Square Deal, a publication company started by Reshard Gool, partner of Hilda Woolnough
Square Deal, a 1982 album by Mick Jackson
Square Deal, a 2003 album by The Wailing Souls
The Square Deal, a series of Car Warriors novels by David Drake

See also
Square (slang)
Johnson City, New York, known as the Square deal town
Johnson City Square Deal Arch
Endicott-Johnson Co. & The Square Deal, the employment practices of George F. Johnson
Endicott Square Deal Arch
J. Eshelman and Company Store, also known as The Square Deal Store
"Quack's Square Deal", an episode of Peep and the Big Wide World
Peter Madden (gang leader)
Franklin Murphy (governor)